Lindsay Gauld (born 14 May 1948) is a Canadian former cyclist. He competed in the individual road race at the 1972 Summer Olympics.

References

External links
 

1948 births
Living people
Canadian male cyclists
Olympic cyclists of Canada
Cyclists at the 1972 Summer Olympics
Sportspeople from Brandon, Manitoba